The 2021 Singhu border lynching refers to the lynching incident that occurred in the early hours of 15 October 2021 at Delhi's Singhu border, resulting in the death of Lakhbir Singh, a Dalit Sikh from Tarn Taran district of Punjab, India. The murder began with the victim's hand and a leg being chopped off, and later his body was hanged on a barricade near the farmers’ protest site. A Nihang Sikh group took responsibility for the lynching and killing, claiming that the man committed sacrilege of their holy scripture. A Nihang accepted his role in the murder, and surrendered on the same day. The second accused, who also belongs to the Nihang group, was arrested by the Amritsar police. After being taken into the police custody, the second accused claimed that he had surrendered before the police. Meanwhile, the Samyukta Kisan Morcha (SKM) distanced itself from the alleged lynching of the man, and agreed to cooperate with the police in the investigation. The Bhim Army extended financial support for the family of the victim and demanded an impartial probe from the CBI. In addition, 15 Dalit organizations have also called for strict action against the culprits in the killing of Lakhbir Singh at the Singhu border. Meanwhile, the victim's family has complained to the "National Commission for Scheduled Castes" about the lack of support from the Punjab state government.

Background
On night of 14 October 2021, a dalit Sikh labourer, Lakhbir Singh from Cheema Khurd village of Tarn Taran district was lynched by Nihang Sikhs present at farmers' protest site on the allegations of sacrilege by his picking up the copy of a Sarbloh Granth. Family members of Lakhbir  denied his role in alleged sacrilege. Village residents told The Caravan that they had first seen main accused Nihang Sarabjit Singh in the village about three months earlier, near the Sarai Amanat Khan police station. Several other villagers had seen Sarabjit in Cheema Kalan on several occasions driving a Bolero Camper car close to a langar hall being built near the village’s bus stand. On 12 October Lakhbir was seen leaving the market when one man on a bike picked up Lakhbir from the nearby cremation ground crossing and handed him over to two Nihangs.

See also
2021 Lynchings for sacrilege in Punjab
Lynching of Jagmael Singh

References

2021 murders in India
Attacks in India in 2021
Lynching deaths in India
October 2021 events in India
October 2021 crimes in Asia
People murdered in Delhi
Caste-related violence in India
Deaths by blade weapons
Nihang
Sikh terrorism in India
Dalit history
Deaths by person in India